is a Japanese novelist.

He was born in Nagoya, Japan, and has published stories since 1977, especially young adult science fiction.

Works in English translation
Crime Novel
Labyrinth (original title: Meikyū), trans. Deborah Iwabuchi (Shueisha English Edition, 2013)

Short stories
Japanese Entrance Exams for Earnest Young Men (original title: Kokugo nyūshi mondai hisshōhō), trans. Jeffrey Hunter (Monkey Brain Sushi: New Tastes in Japanese Fiction, Kodansha International, 1991)
Jack and Betty Forever (original title: Eien no Jyakku & Betti), trans. Frederik L. Schodt (The Columbia Anthology of Modern Japanese Literature: Volume 2, From 1945 to the Present, Columbia University Press, 2007)

Awards and nominations
 1988 - Yoshikawa Eiji Prize for New Writers: Japanese Entrance Exams for Earnest Young Men and other stories (short story collection)
 1989 - Nominee for Naoki Prize:  (novel)
 1990 - Nominee for Naoki Prize:  (novel)
 1992 - Nominee for Naoki Prize:  (novel)

See also
 Japanese detective fiction
 Japanese science fiction
 Japanese literature
 List of Japanese authors

References

External links 
http://www.asahi-net.or.jp/~JF7Y-SMZ/ in Japanese

1947 births
Living people
People from Nagoya
Japanese writers
Japanese mystery writers
Japanese crime fiction writers
Japanese science fiction writers
Aichi University of Education alumni